Anton Biersack (14 July 1927 – 30 March 2007) was a German ice hockey player. He competed in the men's tournament at the 1956 Winter Olympics.

References

External links
 

1927 births
2007 deaths
Olympic ice hockey players of Germany
Olympic ice hockey players of the United Team of Germany
Ice hockey players at the 1956 Winter Olympics
Sportspeople from Garmisch-Partenkirchen